The Canadian Bank of Commerce in Watson, Saskatchewan, was constructed in 1906 in a Greek Revival style. The Toronto firm of Pearson and Darling served as architects. This building was designated a National Historic Site of Canada in 1977 and currently houses the Watson and District Heritage Museum.

References

Buildings and structures in Saskatchewan
Commercial buildings completed in 1906
National Historic Sites in Saskatchewan
Darling and Pearson buildings
Greek Revival architecture in Canada
Canadian Imperial Bank of Commerce
1906 establishments in Saskatchewan